"Lord Have Mercy on a Country Boy" is a song written by Bob McDill, and recorded by American country music artist Don Williams.  It was released in May 1991 as the third single from his album True Love. The song was Williams' last top ten single, peaking at no. 7 on Hot Country Songs and no. 17 on Canadian RPM Country Tracks.

The song has been covered by a number of artists, most notably Josh Turner on his 2006 album Your Man.

Chart performance

Year-end charts

References

1991 singles
Don Williams songs
Josh Turner songs
Songs written by Bob McDill
Song recordings produced by Garth Fundis
RCA Records singles
1991 songs